Kuuno Ola Honkonen (1 March 1922 – 9 July 1985) was a Finnish politician in the left-wing Finnish People's Democratic League. He was a member of the Finnish parliament, Eduskunta, from 1958 until 1979. In 1979, he became the Finnish ambassador to East Germany.

Honkonen was also an athlete, who finished 17th in the high jump at the 1948 Olympics.

References 

1922 births
1985 deaths
People from Jakobstad
Finnish People's Democratic League politicians
Members of the Parliament of Finland (1958–62)
Members of the Parliament of Finland (1962–66)
Members of the Parliament of Finland (1966–70)
Members of the Parliament of Finland (1970–72)
Members of the Parliament of Finland (1972–75)
Members of the Parliament of Finland (1975–79)
Ambassadors of Finland to East Germany
Athletes (track and field) at the 1948 Summer Olympics
Finnish male high jumpers
Olympic athletes of Finland
Finnish sportsperson-politicians